This is a list of international presidential trips made by Michel Aoun, the 13th President of Lebanon.

2017

2018

2019

2022

References 

Lists of diplomatic visits by heads of state
Lebanon diplomacy-related lists
Lists of 21st-century trips
Michel Aoun